Robert Gribbroek (March 16, 1906 – October 13, 1971) was a layout artist and background painter at the Warner Bros. Cartoons from 1945 until 1964. He was first credited in Chuck Jones' Lost and Foundling (1944), and he worked mainly for Jones until 1952 when he joined Robert McKimson's unit (Jones, meanwhile, replaced him with Maurice Noble).

After the Warner's cartoon unit closed, he rejoined Jones at the MGM cartoon department. He retired in 1965. His last original credited work was as a layout artist on the 1966 Spanish animated feature El mago de los sueños (though Gribbroek would be credited on later Warner compilation specials/features, for his work on the classic Warner cartoons).

Gribbroek was not a highly celebrated artist during his career, but many cartoon fans have since come to admire his work.

Gribbroek was born near Rochester, New York to Edward C. and Ada O. Gribbroek but studied art in Taos, New Mexico, where he later died in 1971, at the age of 65.

References

External links

1906 births
1971 deaths
Background artists
American animators
Warner Bros. Cartoons people